Tunisia competed at the 2019 Military World Games held in Wuhan, China from 18 to 27 October 2019. In total, athletes representing Tunisia won one gold medal and the country finished in 31st place in the medal table.

Medal summary

Medal by sports

Medalists

References 
 2019 Military World Games Results

Nations at the 2019 Military World Games
2019 in Tunisian sport